Dimitri Coutya (born 7 October 1997) is a British wheelchair fencer.  He won a team silver, a team bronze and two individual bronze medals for Great Britain in Wheelchair fencing at the 2020 Summer Paralympics at the Makuhari Messe, Tokyo, Japan.

Fencing internationally in Épée Cat B and Foil Cat B, he won a total of 48 Men Single Individual medals for Paralympics GB. He is the first British wheelchair fencer to win a Major individual Title in Foil (Rome 2017 World Championship - Men Individual Cat B Foil Gold).

After reaching the Épée quarter final in Rio 2016, Dimitri won two world championships golds in Rome 2017. He won his first European championships Gold in 2018 in Terni - Italy. At the 2019 world championships in Cheong Ju - South Korea, Dimitri won a Gold in Épée and a Silver in Foil.

For several years Dimitri has been ranked world no.1 in both Wheelchair Fencing Cat B Épée and Cat B Foil.

References

Living people
1997 births
Wheelchair fencers at the 2020 Summer Paralympics
Medalists at the 2020 Summer Paralympics
Place of birth missing (living people)